Dadra and Nagar Haveli Cricket Association is the governing body of the Cricket activities in the Union Territory of Dadra and Nagar Haveli in India and the Dadra and Nagar Haveli cricket team. It is not affiliated to the Board of Control for Cricket in India. However it is affiliated to Gujarat Cricket Association as a District Association.

References

Cricket administration in India
Cricket in Dadra and Nagar Haveli and Daman and Diu